A86 (sometimes called "Paris super-périphérique") is the second ring road around Paris, France. It follows an irregular path around Paris with the distance from the city centre (Notre Dame) varying in the  range. The south-western section of A86 contains one of the world's longest urban motorway tunnels ( of continuous tunnel), opened in two parts in 2009 and 2011.

Although now a complete motorway-standard loop, the A86 is a product of its heavily urban  route and piecemeal construction, meaning that there are several points at which one has to TOTSO (Turn Off To Stay On) and sections which are briefly parts of the A3 and A4 autoroutes.

A86 is a part of the five-ring-road system surrounding Paris and Île-de-France:
 Boulevard Périphérique, completed in 1973, roughly an ellipse  and limits of Paris city.
 A86, completed in 2011, irregular, similar in size with London's North Circular and South Circular.
 The Francilienne, a partial ring, circa  in diameter, comparable with London's M25 motorway.
 The Grand contournement de Paris, two wide loops bypassing Paris, referred to as the First and Second Solutions.

Exit list

See also
 Boulevard Périphérique
 Francilienne

References

External links

 Official Website of the A86 West Tunnel System

Autoroutes in France
Transport infrastructure in Île-de-France
Ring roads in France